Wesley Chapel may refer to:

United States 
 Wesley Chapel (Woodlawn, Arkansas), listed on the NRHP in Arkansas
 Wesley Chapel, Florida, cdp 20 miles north of Downtown Tampa
 Wesley Chapel Methodist Episcopal Church (Eldersburg, Maryland), listed on the NRHP in Maryland
 Wesley Chapel, North Carolina
 Wesley Chapel (Cincinnati), Ohio, a former church
 Wesley Chapel (Hilliard, Ohio), listed on the NRHP in Ohio
 Wesley Chapel (Hopetown, Ohio), listed on the NRHP in Ohio
 Wesley Chapel, Texas, Houston County, Texas
 Wesley Chapel A.M.E Church, Georgetown, Texas, listed on the NRHP

United Kingdom
 Wesley Chapel, Harrogate, North Yorkshire, England
 Wesley Chapel, Priory Street, in York, in England

See also
 Wesley's Chapel, London, England
 Wesley Methodist Church (disambiguation)